Sopište is a municipality in the northern part of North Macedonia. Sopište is also the name of the village where the municipal seat is found. It is located in the Skopje Statistical Region.

Geography
The municipality borders the City of Skopje to the north, Želino Municipality and Makedonski Brod Municipality to the west, and Studeničani Municipality to the east.

Demographics
According to the 2021 Macedonian census, the municipality has 6,713 inhabitants. Ethnic groups in the municipality:

People from Sopište
 Igor Durlovski, a Macedonian opera singer
 , a Macedonian opera singer
 Rabi W. Sédrak, Immigration specialist and founder of Balkan's Integration and Immigration Program

Inhabited places
The 5656 inhabitants of the municipality of Sopište live in 1510 houses and 3398 apartments.
There are 13 settlements in Sopište with the absence of a classic urban center.

In the municipality there are the following settlements:

Sopište        1365
Rakotinci      394
Dobri Dol      431
Dolno Sonje    707
Gorno Sonje    240
Barovo	        24
Govrlevo       31
Čiflik         664
Sveta Petka    718
Jabolče        44
Nova Breznica  89
Držilovo       365
Patiška Reka   584

References

External links
Official website

 
Skopje Statistical Region
Municipalities of North Macedonia